Alex von Tunzelmann (born 1977) is a British historian, screenwriter and author.

Early life and education
Tunzelmann has stated that her surname is of German ancestry originating in Saxony in Germany and that she has family connections from Estonia since 1600 and New Zealand since 1850.

Tunzelmann was educated at Brighton and Hove High School, an independent school for girls in Brighton, and at University College at the University of Oxford. She read history and edited both Cherwell and Isis.

Career
Tunzelmann has contributed to The Political Animal by Jeremy Paxman, The Truth About Markets by John Kay, Does Education Matter? by Alison Wolf, and Not on the Label by Felicity Lawrence. She has been recognized as a Financial Times Young Business Writer of the Year. She collaborated with Jeremy Paxman on his book, On Royalty.

From 2008 to 2016, Tunzelmann wrote a column for The Guardian entitled "Reel history", in which she discussed and rated popular films for their historical accuracy. She has also written for The New York Times, Los Angeles Times, The Washington Post, The Daily Telegraph, Conde Nast Traveller, BBC Lonely Planet Magazine, and The Daily Beast. She published Blood and Sand about the Suez Crisis of 1956 in 2016.

Indian Summer: The Secret History of the End of an Empire, 2007, her first book, details the independence of India in 1947 and the process leading up to it, as well as the consequences after independence.
Red Heat. Conspiracy, Murder, and the Cold War in the Caribbean, 2011, covers the relationship of the United States with Cuba, the Dominican Republic, and Haiti during the time of the Cold War. Her overall framework is based on the idea that the Cold War was not a static phenomenon but instead dynamic and involved 'hot wars' as well.
Fallen Idols: Twelve Statues That Made History, 2021, an exploration of the stories of twelve statues or groups of statues of historical figures that later became contentious, prompted by the removal or defacement of statues during the George Floyd protests of 2020. It was shortlisted for the 2022 Wolfson History Prize.

She has appeared on the literary discussion radio programme Litbits on Resonance FM, discussing literature and hair. She appears regularly on Sky News and on BBC current affairs programmes.

Screenwriting
Tunzelmann wrote the script for the movie Churchill, a film that received mixed reviews, with some publications citing numerous historical inaccuracies. She also wrote episodes of the RAI period drama Medici, focusing on the powerful Florentine family.

A film based on her book Indian Summer is currently in development with Working Title Films.

References

External links

 Alex von Tunzelmann at Twitter
 

1977 births
Living people
20th-century British women writers
21st-century British historians
21st-century British women writers
21st-century British writers
Alumni of University College, Oxford
British film critics
British film historians
British people of German descent
British television writers
British women historians
Cold War historians
Historians of the British Empire
Historians of India
People educated at Brighton and Hove High School
Women film critics
British women television writers